Dashkin is a village in Astore, Pakistan. It is 85 km from Gilgit, the capital of Gilgit-Baltistan. It has over 5,000 inhabitants, primarily farmers and herdsmen.

The area is rich in gemstones and is home to a number of rare species of wildlife, such as the Astor markhor (a species of ibex) and the snow leopard. Dofana Mountain and several forests are nearby. Hunting permits are available.

In 2003, the International Union of Nature Conservation launched a pilot to test the concept of community-based forest management in the Dashkin–_Mushkin–Tarbuling Forest as part of the Mountain Areas Conservancy Project, an initiative aimed at sustaining biodiversity in Karakoram-Hindu Kush in the western Himalayan mountains in northern Pakistan.

The people of Dashkin engage in some traditional sports like swimming, riding, hunting, kabdi, basra and rasa kashi. The village has many natural resources, and the Dichil Nallah of Dashkin has many gemstones. The people of Dashkin has active political role in Gilgit-Baltistan since independence. There are a number of notable people from this small village, including:Martyer #Hawaldar Bilal sacrifice their life for us and got #tamgah Jurait .Dr. Talibullah Shah (late), SSP Amir Hamza (late),DC.Swal Meer(late) Advocate Siffat Khan (late), Inspector Muhammad Ibrahim (late) and Molana Adul Sami, Shams Uddin ,Dr. Muhammad Iqbal, Headmaster Barkat shah (Retd),DDO.Mirbaz Khan(late),Dc. Amir Azam Hamza,AC.Nisar Ahmed,Professor Abdul Razaq,Lecturer Shams Ur Rehman. Academic from the area include Khalid Mahmood M.Phil from Quid-i-Azam University, Ph.D from ICCBS, Karachi University; Raza ullah M.Phil leading to Ph.D HEJ. Research Institute of Chemistry, ICCBS, University of Karachi and 20+ medical doctors.7+ Army officers,and many sons of this land sacrifices their life for our motherland #Pakistan and a number of many people belong to many departments.A great Historian of GB Abdul Mujeeb Fani hailing from this village.

References 

Populated places in Astore District